CELSA Group is a multinational group of steel companies headquartered in Spain, mainly in the industry of steel reinforcement or rebar.

History
It was formed in 1967 as the Compañía Española de Laminación. Competitors of the company include Salzgitter AG, of Salzgitter in Germany.

Structure
It is headquartered in Castellbisbal in Spain. It is composed of eight main steel companies, across Europe.

Celsa Steel UK

Celsa Steel UK is in Cardiff, and is the UK's largest manufacturer of steel reinforcement products. In November 2015, two people died at its Cardiff manufacturing site on East Moors Road.

During the COVID-19 pandemic, the UK government provided Celsa Steel UK with a £30 million bailout to help it continue trading providing it met a set of conditions. This made it the first company to receive a loan through the government's financial support scheme known as Project Birch.

Since 2010, the plant has used GB Railfreight for freight services. This includes both incoming supply of scrap steel, outgoing finished products, as well as on-site shunting services using remotely-controlled British Rail Class 08 locomotives, supplemented by sub-contract locomotive supply from Harry Needle Railroad Company.

See also
 Community (trade union)
 Ferrous metal recycling

References

1967 establishments in Spain
Manufacturing companies established in 1967
Multinational companies headquartered in Spain
Steel companies of Spain
Structural steel